The term hamadryad has several uses:

Hamadryad, a kind of nymph in Greek mythology
Hamadryad, another term for the king cobra
Hamadryas baboon, a kind of baboon
Hamadryad, an alien species in Alastair Reynolds's novel Revelation Space
Hamadryad, a character introduced in Robert A. Heinlein's novel Time Enough for Love
Hamadryad, a natural history journal from India
Hamadryad, the common name of the butterfly species Tellervo zoilus, endemic to far north Queensland in Australia
Three British warships named HMS Hamadryad
Royal Hamadryad Hospital, Cardiff